Higby is an unincorporated community in Ross County, in the U.S. state of Ohio.

History
Higby had its start when the railroad was extended to that point. The community has the name of Judiah Ellsworth Higby,  a pioneer citizen. A post office called Higby was established in 1878, and remained in operation until 1933.

References

Unincorporated communities in Ross County, Ohio
Unincorporated communities in Ohio
1878 establishments in Ohio
Populated places established in 1878